Porphyrostemma is a genus of African plants in the tribe Inuleae within the family Asteraceae.

 Species
 Porphyrostemma chevalieri (O.Hoffm.) Hutch. & Dalziel
 Porphyrostemma grantii Benth. ex Oliv.
 Porphyrostemma monocephala Leins
 formerly included
see Inula 
 Porphyrostemma cuanzensis (Welw.) O.Hoffm. - Inula cuanzensis (Welw.) Hiern

References

Asteraceae genera
Inuleae
Flora of Africa
Taxa named by Daniel Oliver
Taxa named by George Bentham